Bryan Charnley (20 September 1949 – 19 July 1991) was a British artist who had paranoid schizophrenia, and explored its effects in his work. He committed suicide in July 1991.

Early life and flower paintings
Bryan John Charnley was born on 20 September 1949 in Stockton-on-Tees.  With his twin brother he grew up in London, Chislehurst, in Kent, Cranfield, where his father worked as a Senior Lecturer, and finally in Bromham near Bedford. In the summer of 1968, aged 18, he had a nervous breakdown but was able to study at Leicester School of Art later that year. In 1969, Charnley gained a place at the Central School of Art and Design in Holborn, London, but was unable to complete the course due to another breakdown that was later diagnosed as acute schizophrenia.

From 1971 until 1977 he lived at home with his parents between periods of hospitalisation and treatment including electroconvulsive therapy (ECT). In 1978 he moved to Bedford and began painting.

Charnley's work during this period drew heavily on photo-realism, then enjoying popularity in America, rather than the conceptual art that was fashionable in the London art scene, and he produced many large-scale paintings of flowers. However, Charnley was also interested in the work of fellow British artist Bridget Riley, in whose work he saw a 'cool discipline' combined with a strong emotional charge.

Relationship with Pam Jones
In 1982, Charnley painted a double portrait of himself and his partner Pam, in what has been called "the high point of Charnley's photorealistic early period". The composition and treatment demonstrates Charnley's interest in the work of David Hockney. Five years later, Pam, who also experienced mental illness, attempted suicide by jumping out of a window. Though she survived, her spine was badly damaged. Charnley's trauma is explored in his painting of the same year, Leaving by the Window.

Stylistic development
Charnley had been exploring his inner life through painting since at least 1982, particularly addressing the experience of schizophrenia. Writing in 1988, Charnley said he had "found [himself] on an interior journey in which landscape and subject were subsumed to inner vision". However, from 1987 onwards, he increasingly drew on Sigmund Freud's theories about dreams, using elaborate symbolism to convey his mental state.

In 1984 four of his paintings were purchased by the Bethlem Royal Hospital for their permanent collection. During this period, Charnley also studied the work of other artists held in the Bethlem collection, notably William Kurelek and Louis Wain, whose work "seemed to me to have a power to move far beyond that expected of the patient as an artist. Here I saw art stripped of all esoteric and conceptual pretensions". Charnley's elaborately symbolist work from this period includes To the Farm (1987), Grey Self-Portrait (1986), and Brooch Schizophrene (1987), paintings that have also since been acquired by Bethlem Museum of the Mind.

Charnley had a solo exhibition at the Dryden Street Gallery, Covent Garden in London 1989, and exhibited two paintings at the Visions exhibition at the Royal College of Art in 1990, curated by Aiden Shingler. However, he still struggled to make a living from his art.

Final works and death
Charnley was frustrated by his apparent lack of success in the art market, and what recognition he received was outweighed by the day to day problems of his illness and the heavy medication he was prescribed to counter it. These factors contributed to his decision early in 1991 to paint a series of self portraits chronicling his experience as he reduced his medication. The journalist and CEO of SANE, Marjorie Wallace, encouraged Charnley to keep a diary of his progress. Charnley made the diary an integral part of the portraits using the text to explain the imagery he was using and to describe his existential state. The Self Portrait Series consists of seventeen paintings. There is debate as to whether the last painting is incomplete due to the presence of a date in the lower right corner.  Marjorie Wallace's article on Charnley's Self Portraits was published in the Telegraph Magazine in December 1991. He may have been partially influenced by Louis Wain's Kaleidoscope Cats, held in the collection of Bethlem Museum of the Mind, which are (incorrectly) thought to chart the progress of Wain's mental disorder. In July 1991, he killed himself.

Exhibitions
 Bryan Charnley, Dryden Street Gallery, London, 1989
 Visions, Royal College of Art, London 1990 (group exhibition)
 Crossing the Border, Harris Art Gallery and Museum, Preston 1995
 Bryan Charnley: Self Portrait Face to Face with Schizophrenia, National Portrait Gallery 1995
 Bryan Charnley The Art of Schizophrenia, Bethlem Museum of the Mind, 2015

Gallery

References

Further reading
 James Charnley (2018). "Bryan Charnley: Art & Adversity", Manchester, i2i Publishing 
 Kirsten Tambling (2015). Bryan Charnley: the Art of Schizophrenia (exhibition catalogue). Beckenham: Bethlem Museum of the Mind. Catalogue of an exhibition at Bethlem Museum of the Mind, 12 February - 22 May 2015.
 Robert Howard (October 2001). Psychiatry in pictures. The British Journal of Psychiatry 179 (4): A14.
 Website of the Estate of Bryan Charnley

1949 births
Alumni of the Central School of Art and Design
English artists
People with schizophrenia
Outsider artists
Painters who committed suicide
1991 suicides
English twins